WRTU (89.7 FM), branded on-air as Radio Universidad de Puerto Rico, is a National Public Radio member station broadcasting a variety format, together with programming from NPR, PRX, the BBC and other distributors. Licensed to San Juan, Puerto Rico, the station is currently owned by the University of Puerto Rico.

WRTU's programming can also be heard in Mayagüez on WRUO 88.3 FM.

External links
 WRTU 89.7 Radio Universidad de Puerto Rico
 WRTU Webcast

RTU
Radio stations established in 1980
University of Puerto Rico
NPR member stations
1980 establishments in Puerto Rico
Public broadcasting in Puerto Rico
Campus, college, student and university radio stations